John O. Dahlgren (September 14, 1872 – February 11, 1963) was an American corporal serving in the United States Marine Corps during the Boxer Rebellion who received the Medal of Honor for bravery.

Biography
Dahlgren was born September 14, 1872, in Kalmar, Sweden and after entering the Marine Corps he was sent to fight in the Chinese Boxer Rebellion.

He received the Medal for his actions in Peking, China from June 20 – July 16, 1900 and it was presented to him July 19, 1901.

He died February 11, 1963, and is buried in Golden Gate National Cemetery, San Bruno, California.

Medal of Honor citation
Rank and organization: Corporal, U.S. Marine Corps. Born: September 14, 1872, Kahliwar, Sweden. Accredited to: California. G.O. No.: 55, July 19, 1901.

Citation:

In the presence of the enemy during the battle of Peking, China, 20 June to 16 July 1900, Dahlgren distinguished himself by meritorious conduct.

See also

 List of Medal of Honor recipients
 List of Medal of Honor recipients for the Boxer Rebellion

References

External links
 
 

1872 births
1963 deaths
United States Marine Corps Medal of Honor recipients
United States Marines
American military personnel of the Boxer Rebellion
Foreign-born Medal of Honor recipients
Swedish emigrants to the United States
Boxer Rebellion recipients of the Medal of Honor
Burials at Golden Gate National Cemetery
People from Kalmar